The Civic Opera Building is a 45-story office tower (plus two 22-story wings) located at 20 North Wacker Drive in Chicago. The building opened November 4, 1929, and has an Art Deco interior. It contains a 3,563-seat opera house, the Civic Opera House, which is the second-largest opera auditorium in North America. The opera house is the permanent home of the Lyric Opera of Chicago, and home of the Joffrey Ballet since 1995.

Samuel Insull envisioned and hired the design team for building a new opera house to serve as the home for the Chicago Civic Opera, as the company was called. The building is shaped like a huge chair, sometimes referred to as "Insull's Throne." Insull directed the chair should face west to signify turning his back on New York. Insull had left a vice presidency at General Electric in New York in 1892, after he was not named its president. Subsequently, he moved to Chicago and became president of Chicago Edison (Commonwealth Edison).

Insull selected the architecture firm Graham, Anderson, Probst & White who were responsible for several other buildings in the downtown Chicago Loop. As they did on other occasions, the architects commissioned Henry Hering to produce architectural sculpture for the building.

Mary Garden of the Chicago Civic Opera announced on July 15, 1929, that the opera's inaugural season would include the commissioned work of Hamilton Forrest entitled Camille.

During the 1950s and 1960s the building was identified by a large "Kemper Insurance" sign, although it was not that company's headquarters. In 1993, the Lyric Opera of Chicago purchased the opera house facilities in the building it had rented for 64 years.

In 2012, Tishman Speyer Properties L.P. sold the  office tower portion of the building for $125.8 million to an affiliate of Nanuet, N.Y.-based Berkley Properties LLC.

Tenants
 Cassiday Schade
 National Automatic Merchandising Association
 Himes Consulting Group
 TechNexus Venture Collaborative
 12five Capital, LLC
 Hybris
 Surplus Record Machinery & Equipment Directory
 Clarity Consulting
 Perficient Consulting
 Natural Resources Defense Council

References
Notes

Sources
Chappell, Sally Kitt, Transforming Tradition: Architecture and Planning of Graham, Anderson, Probst and White, 1912–1936, Chicago, Il: University of Chicago Press, 1992
Kvaran, Einar Einarsson, Architectural Sculpture in America, unpublished manuscript

External links
"The Magic Wand of the Opera" Popular Mechanics, February 1930, pp 202-205 technical details of the 1929 advances Civic Opera House over other opera houses of that era - i.e. curtains, back-drops, movable stages, lighting, etc
Chicago landmarks web site with photos of the building
Civic Opera House website
Lyric Opera website

Central Chicago
Skyscraper office buildings in Chicago
1929 establishments in Illinois
Office buildings completed in 1929
Art Deco architecture in Illinois